Legio VII Claudia (Claudius' Seventh Legion) was a legion of the Imperial Roman army.

History 
According to H.M.D. Parker, the first legion Julius Caesar raised for his campaigns in Cisalpine Gaul was the Seventh; the numbers 1-4 were omitted by custom because the first four legions were under the direct command of the consuls. The Roman commander mentions the Seventh in his account of the battle against the Nervians, and it seems that it was employed during the expedition through western Gaul led by Caesar's deputy Crassus. In 56 BC, the Seventh was present during the Venetic campaign. During the crisis caused by Vercingetorix, it fought in the neighborhood of Lutetia; it must have been active at Alesia and it was certainly involved in the mopping-up operations among the Bellovaci. Legio VII was one of the two legions used in Caesar's invasions of Britain, and played a crucial role in the Battle of Pharsalus in 48 BC. 

At one point Caesar's Legio VII was disbanded, and it veterans settled at Capua. However, Octavian had need of soldiers and recalled its members to service, where they fought in the Battle of Mutina. Its early nickname Macedonia attested in four inscriptions may reflect it was at the Battle of Philippi; otherwise, this attests that the imperial Legio VII was stationed in Macedonia before it was redeployed to Dalmatia.

The legion was present in Dalmatia when Lucius Arruntius Camillus Scribonianus rebelled against the emperor Claudius in AD 42, but refused to support Scribonianus. For this the legion received the honorary titles Claudia pia fidelis. Parker postulates that when Legio IV Scythica was transferred from Moesia to Syria between AD 55 and 62, Legio VII Claudia was moved to Moesia to replace it.

During the Year of Four Emperors, the legion followed the lead of Legio III Gallica in revolting against Vitellius and declaring for Vespasian. It was part of the army that Marcus Aponius Saturninus lead into northern Italy, and when Saturninus fell out of favor with his troops followed Marcus Antonius Primus in the subsequent Second Battle of Bedriacum. 

Following Vespasian's victory over Vitellius, Legio VII Claudia was ordered back to Moesia. An inscription from the reign of Antoninus Pius attests that it remained in this station, although Moesia had been divided into Moesia Superior (where the legion had its headquarters), and Moesia Inferior. The legion existed at least until the end of the 4th century, guarding the middle Danube.

Tiberius Claudius Maximus, the Roman soldier who brought the head of Decebalus to the emperor Trajan, was serving in Legio VII Claudia. An inscription in Pompeii revealed that a certain Floronius also served in the seventh legion. The inscription says: "Floronius, privileged soldier of the 7th legion, was here. The women did not know of his presence. Only six women came to know, too few for such a stallion."

Attested members

See also
 List of Roman legions

References

External links
 livius.org

Further reading 
 M. Mirkowic, "The Roster of the VII Claudia legion",  Zeitschrift für Papyrologie und Epigraphik, 146 (2004), pp. 211–20.
 D. Toncinić, Monuments of Legio VII in the Roman Province of Dalmatia. Split, 2011.

07 Claudia
Roman legions involved in Julius Caesar's invasions of Britain
Military units and formations established in the 1st century BC